The Thing Called Love is a 1993 American comedy-drama film directed by Peter Bogdanovich and starring Samantha Mathis as Miranda Presley, a young musician who tries to make it big in Nashville. River Phoenix, Dermot Mulroney and Sandra Bullock also star. While the film involves a love triangle and various complications in Miranda's route to success, it provides a sweetened glimpse at the lives of aspiring songwriters in Nashville. Its tagline is: "Stand by your dream".

The film was Phoenix's final complete screen performance before his death. Bogdanovich called the movie "a little picture with a slightly meandering French quality."

A "making of" documentary is available on the film's DVD release, titled The Thing Called Love: A Look Back.

Plot
Miranda Presley is an aspiring singer/songwriter from New York City who loves country music and decides to take her chances in Nashville, Tennessee, where she hopes to become a star. Arriving after a long bus ride, Miranda makes her way to the Bluebird Café, a local bar with a reputation as a showcase for new talent. Although she arrives too late to audition for that week's roster, the bar's owner Lucy likes the plucky newcomer and gives her a job as a waitress.

By the café's second week of auditions, Miranda has become familiar with some other Nashville transplants who are looking to land a gig or sell a song. This includes sweet and open-hearted Kyle Davidson of Connecticut, moody but talented James Wright from Texas, and spunky Linda Lue Linden of Alabama. Linda Lue talks Miranda into sharing her motel room, which her mother is subsidizing. As the four friends struggle to find their place in the competitive Nashville music scene, both Kyle and James display a romantic interest in Miranda, but she is drawn to James in spite of his moody temperament. 

James convinces Miranda to spend time together, partially under the pretense of writing music. They have a date ending with a kiss, but he does not follow through with a telephone call the next day. Days later they coincide in a recording studio, and he practically ignores her. 

Convincing Kyle that a song he wrote is good enough to be sung by an established singer, Miranda helps him sneak the tape into a singer's car's tapedeck. Unfortunately, the police notice and apprehend them. The singer follows them, listening to the tape on the way. Enamored, she chooses not to press charges and tells Kyle she would like the song. 

Out dancing on a double date with Kyle and Linda Lue and her boyfriend, Miranda line dances. James is called to perform his music, and for his second song, he asks her to help him sing it. Singing together, their chemistry is palpable. Kyle is visibly upset when Miranda tells him she is leaving with James.

They have a whirlwind romance. Miranda moves in with James, and in a few short days they take an impromptu road trip to Graceland. In a convenience store, he obtains a toy ring from a candy dispenser, and he proposes marriage. One of the clerks gets her brother to officiate a brief ceremony, and they return to Nashville married.

At the café that evening, James and Kyle come to blows over Miranda. The subsequent months, the newlyweds soon realize marriage takes work. They rarely see each other because of her odd sleeping hours and his isolating himself in his practice room.

James leaves Miranda behind to make his album for some months in Texas, what he always wanted to do. He realizes he left his heart with her, so he comes back to the Bluebird Café, seeking Miranda, but he learns that she has left for New York City. 

Miranda returns and sings a new song which finally earns her a spot performing in the Bluebird, before tentatively reuniting with James. Kyle joins them as Linda Lue leaves for New York to try acting, and the remaining three discuss writing a song together.

Cast

Production
The film was to have been directed by Brian Gibson but in September 1992 he left the project to make What's Love Got to Do with It and was replaced by Peter Bogdanovich.

Bogdanovich says Phoenix approached Paramount to appear in the film. "He was brilliant to work with," said the director. "There were maybe two days during the 60-day shoot that I felt he wasn't as together as he was on other days. But one day, it was freezing cold and the other day, he took some kind of cold medicine that didn't agree with him. That was what I was told. But all the rest of the time, he was great...  He was concerned with more than his own role. He was concerned with the overall picture, with the other actors and characters... He would have made a very good director.""

The film focuses on the songwriters rather than the performers. "It's a different kind of crowd," said Bogdanovich. "More cerebral, less about the glitz."

The film features cameos from Trisha Yearwood, Pam Tillis and Kevin Welch. River Phoenix wrote two songs including "Lone Star State of Mine"; Dermot Mulroney wrote one, and Sandra Bullock wrote lyrics for the song she performed. Bogdanovich admitted the film had some similarities to Fame and Flashdance movies that became "kind of a genre of its own... We tried to play by the rules of that. {But} we also tried to play against that -- we tried to make it different from that kind of movie. We tried to walk a sometimes difficult tightrope."

Soundtrack

The film's soundtrack features twelve songs, all done by various country artists.

Track listing

Reception

Critical response
 

Todd McCarthy of Variety magazine wrote: "Perhaps there's not much new to say about the dues and disappointments involved in breaking into the country music scene, but the scenes are fresh and the emotions real in Peter Bogdanovich's tune-laden, mixed-mood drama."

Roger Ebert of the Chicago Sun-Times gave it 1 out of 4 and wrote: "Perhaps no one could have saved Phoenix, who was not lucky enough to find a higher bottom than death. But this performance in this movie should have been seen by someone as a cry for help."

Box office
The film debuted in several Southern markets. It was expected to open wider in autumn, but Paramount decided against this following the death of River Phoenix. The movie ultimately ranked among the least profitable films of 1993. "Paramount did do some releases in Seattle and a few other places," said Bogdanovich in 1994. "But I think they were afraid of being accused of exploiting River's death. There was a kind of general worry about that. I guess that is the thinking that prevailed. It's pretty disappointing, but you know, I've learned to go on."

The director felt the death of Phoenix affected watching the movie. "It was a totally different movie before. It had a hopeful quality and now it doesn't. The ending is ambiguous, but because River died, it becomes very sad. The last thing you're left with is that he is dead, even though the character is alive ... (The movie) was supposed to be bittersweet, but it turned out being more bitter than sweet."

References

External links
 
 
 
 

1993 films
1990s romantic comedy-drama films
American romantic comedy-drama films
American musical comedy-drama films
Country music films
Davis Entertainment films
1990s English-language films
Films directed by Peter Bogdanovich
Paramount Pictures films
Films set in Tennessee
Films produced by George Folsey Jr.
Films produced by John Davis
1990s musical comedy-drama films
1993 comedy films
1993 drama films
1990s American films